Dame Lawrence Laurent, DCSL, SLMM, MBE is 
a Saint Lucian educator, parliamentarian, ombudsman, and cultural enthusiast. In 2016, she was appointed the first Dame Commander of the Order of Saint Lucia.

Career
Laurent began as a teacher in Saint Lucia's leading high school for girls, Saint Joseph's Convent, teaching there for sixteen years before being appointed as Vice-Principal (and later Principal) of a new comprehensive secondary school. 

She was selected to serve as Secretary General of Saint Lucia's National Commission for UNESCO and later served as the Regional Chairman. She was Saint Lucia's National Correspondent to the Agency for Cultural and Technical Cooperation, now the International Francophone Organisation (OIF). She served for five years as a Parliamentarian and is a life member of the Commonwealth Parliamentary Association.

In 1996, Laurent was appointed Ombudsman, the first woman to hold that position in the Caribbean. She has been at the forefront of the establishment of various human rights organisations. She also founded the Duke of Edinburgh Award Scheme Council in Saint Lucia.

References

Year of birth missing (living people)
Living people
Saint Lucian educators
20th-century Saint Lucian women politicians
21st-century Saint Lucian women politicians
21st-century Saint Lucian politicians
Saint Lucian dames